The medial collateral artery (also known as the middle collateral artery) is a branch of profunda brachii artery that descends in the middle head of the triceps brachii and assists in forming the anastomosis with the interosseous recurrent artery above the olecranon of the ulna near the elbow.

See also
 radial collateral artery
 superior ulnar collateral artery
 inferior ulnar collateral artery

External links

Arteries of the upper limb